Dried Indian Creek is a stream in the U.S. state of Georgia. It is a tributary to the Yellow River.

According to tradition, Dried Indian Creek was named from an incident when the dried-up corpse of an Indian was discovered near its course.

References

Rivers of Georgia (U.S. state)
Rivers of Newton County, Georgia